Golubki  (also Golubie; , from 1938-45 Kalkhof) is a village in the administrative district of Gmina Kowale Oleckie, within Olecko County, Warmian-Masurian Voivodeship, in northern Poland.

References

Golubki